The Stars & Stripes Festival is a free summertime festival in Sterling Heights, Michigan at Freedom Hill County Park that highlights everything that America has to offer.
This Fourth of July festival, debuted in 2007.  Produced by Funfest Productions Inc, the Stars & Stripes Festival draws over 500,000 people annually to enjoy carnival rides, national and local music acts, cuisine from America the world, tributes to military service members and veterans, art exhibits, and fireworks and laser show displays.

2014
The 8th annual Stars and Stripes Festival added an extra day, so it starts on a Thursday. Notable acts that year included:

 Josh Gracin
 Bret Michaels
 L.A. Guns
 Great White
 George Clinton and The P-Funk All Stars
 Beatlemania, LIVE!

2013
Stars & Stripes Festival moved from downtown Mount Clemens to Freedom Hill County Park this year. The festival featured over 100 bands on 4 different stages including:
 Randy Travis
 Collective Soul
 King's X
 CAKE
 Drowning Pool
 Saliva
 Kool & The Gang
 Halestorm
 Everlast

2012
The 2012 Stars & Stripes festival featured over 100 performances on 4 different stages in three days and included:
 Buckcherry
 Critical Bill
 Eddie Money
 Rhythm Corps
 Skid Row
 Tesla

2011
The 2011 Stars & Stripes Festival featured artists such as:
 Ace Frehley
 Smash Mouth
 Soul Asylum
 Sweet
 Taddy Porter
 Rick Springfield
 Tonic

2010
The 2010 Stars & Stripes Festival featured artists such as:
 The Rockets (Reunion Show)
 John Waite
 Love and Theft
 Dirty Americans
 Vince Neil
 Fuel
 Warrant
 John Michael Montgomery
 Jason Derulo
 Hush

2009
The 2009 Stars & Stripes Festival featured artists such as:
 Morris Day & the TIme
 Uncle Kracker
 Saliva
 Edgar Winter
 Dirty Americans
 Ratt
 Night Ranger
 Dokken
 King's X

2008
The 2008 Stars & Stripes Festival featured artists such as:
 Uncle Kracker
 Everclear
 Jonny Lang
 Candlebox
 Skid Row
 Trent Tomlinson
 The Romantics
 Sponge
 Mitch Ryder
 Gary Hoey
 LA Guns
 Rhythm Corps
 Marshall Crenshaw

2007
In 2007, the first Stars & Stripes Festival was held, which featured artists such as:
 Puddle of Mudd
 Paul Rodgers
 Blue Öyster Cult
 Mark Farner
 Gin Blossoms
 Blessed Union of Souls

References

Music festivals in Michigan